Ailo Mikkelsen Gaup (born 22 January 1979 in Tromsø, Norway) is a former Norwegian Freestyle Motocross rider, who invented the Underflip. Gaup has won the world title in FMX. Gaup originally started his career competing in motocross, but switched to FMX competitions. He announced his retirement in October 2009.

Early years
Ailo was born in Tromsø to parents Mikkel Aslaksen Gaup and author Laila Stien and grew up there and in Máze (Masi) in Kautokeino municipality. His family moved to Alta when Ailo was fourteen years old. As a ten-year-old he sold fish and painted houses to be able to buy a mini-motorcycle and began motorcross cycling. As a sixteen-year-old, he moved to the capital of Oslo to enroll in the motorcross line at The Norwegian College of Elite Sport in Bærum.

Career
Today, Ailo lives in Kongsberg, where he has been located since 2000. He started competing in freestyle motocross in 1999 and won the Norwegian Championship. In 2002 Ailo entered his first international freestyle motocross contest and ended up second overall at his first World Cup contest.

Ailo was the first European to perform a backflip on a motorcycle, in 2003. He was also the first European do long distance backflips, a year later. 
In November 2004 Ailo invented the Underflip, which is a sideways flip on a motorcycle. It took almost two years until anyone else was able to perform this trick. The Underflip has later been copied by riders all over the world.
Gaup has to date won six Norwegian Championships in two different sports, motocross and freestyle motocross/FMX, and won the World Cup in 2003 and 2004. He was crowned World Cup Champion in FMX in 2004 and again in 2007, making him the only rider to win the World Championships in freestyle motocross twice.
He has stated that in spite of his profession, he is scared of heights.
On 17 November 2007 he became the first Norwegian and the first Sámi to win a gold medal in FMX.

As many of his relatives, Ailo has also done some acting. He played Ryzard, a gymnast in a small circus in the movie "Dobbel Salto" in 2005. He also plays the young version of the main character Eivind, in "Jernanger".

External links
 Official website
 Ailo Gaup at expn.com
 

Living people
Freestyle motocross riders
Norwegian motorcycle racers
Norwegian Sámi people
Sportspeople from Tromsø
People from Kongsberg
Norwegian Sámi sportspeople
1979 births
X Games athletes